is a Japanese manga series written and illustrated by Noboru Rokuda about a country boy who fulfills his dream by racing in a Formula One car. It was serialized in Big Comic Spirits between June 15, 1985, and 1992 in the fourteenth to thirty-fifth issue of the magazine. F received the Shogakukan Manga Award in 1991 for seinen/general manga.

It has been adapted into an anime series by Fuji TV and Kitty Film and was broadcast on Fuji TV between March 9, 1988, and December 23, 1988. Atsuko Nakajima of Ranma ½ fame was an animation director on the series. The anime series was also telecast in Italy under the title F - Motori in pista; the protagonist, Gunma Akagi, was renamed "Patrick" in this version.  The anime version of Rokuda's earlier manga Dash Kappei, made by Tatsunoko Production in 1981–1982, had also been successful in Italy.

The sequel, F Regeneration Ruri, was published by Shueisha in 12 bunkobon volumes from 2002 and June 2006.

Anime

Cast
Toshihiko Seki as Gunma Akagi
Akio Ohtsuka as Gorou
Hiroshi Ito as Souichirou Akagi
Hirotaka Suzuoki as Kazuto Hiziri
Kazue Takahashi as Sayuri
Kiyoyuki Yanada as Shouma
Kouji Tsujitani as Yuuma
Rei Sakuma as Ruiko
Sakiko Tamagawa as Junko Komori
Shigeru Chiba as Kinoshita
Shinnosuke Furumoto as Tamotsu Oishi
Tohru Furuya as Kishida
You Yoshimura as Yasuda
Youko Mizutani as Yuki

Music
The series uses four pieces of theme songs. The first theme opening theme is  "F" by The Burst, which was used for episodes one to twenty-one; the second opening theme is "Love Affair" by Kojiro Shimizu, which was used for episodes twenty-two to thirty-one.

References

External links
 F  at Japan Authors' Gallery
 5 Ace's Official F website 
 

1985 manga
1988 anime television series debuts
Kodansha manga
Motorsports in anime and manga
Seinen manga
Shogakukan manga
Shueisha manga
Animated television series about auto racing
Winners of the Shogakukan Manga Award for general manga